McCaskey is a surname. Notable people with the surname include:

Evan McCaskey (1965–1989), American guitarist that played for the bands Exodus and Blind Illusion
John G. McCaskey (1874–1924), American oil businessman
John Piersol McCaskey (1873–1934), American politician and educator
Michael McCaskey (1943–2020), chairman of the Chicago Bears in the National Football League. 
Virginia Halas McCaskey (born 1923), principal owner of the Chicago Bears of the National Football League

See also
J. P. McCaskey High School, public high school located in Lancaster, Pennsylvania, United States

Anglicised Irish-language surnames